The Deputy Prime Minister of Italy, officially Vice-President of the Council of Ministers of the Italian Republic (Italian: Vicepresidente del Consiglio dei ministri della Repubblica Italiana), is a senior member of the Italian Cabinet. Moreover, it is often colloquially known as Vicepremier. The office of the Deputy Prime Minister is not a permanent position, existing only at the discretion of the Prime Minister, who may appoint to other offices to give seniority to a particular Cabinet minister. The office is currently held by Matteo Salvini and Antonio Tajani under Giorgia Meloni's premiership. 

Though they will always have particular responsibilities in government, the Italian deputy prime minister, unlike analogous offices in some other nations, such as a vice-presidency, possesses no special constitutional powers as such, as their powers are solely defined by ordinary law, more specifically, by article 8 of law 400/1998 (Italian: legge 400/1998).

The Deputy Prime Minister (the oldest one in case the office is held by multiple people at once) assumes the duties and powers of the Prime Minister in the latter's absence, illness, or death. In case none was appointed Deputy Prime Minister, it's the oldest Minister who takes the role of the Prime Minister in case the in the latter's absence, illness, or death.

The Deputy Prime Minister does not automatically succeed the Prime Minister in case the latter resigns, as conventionally, in the aftermath of a resignation, the outgoing Prime Minister remains in place to handle day-to-day business until Parliament picks a successor.

In practice, the designation of someone to the role of Deputy Prime Minister may also provide additional practical status within cabinet, enabling the exercise of de facto, if not de jure, power.

In a coalition government, as Enrico Letta Grand coalition government between the Democrats and The People of Freedom, the appointment of the secretary of the smaller party (in the 2014 case, Angelino Alfano, secretary of the PdL) as Deputy Prime Minister is done to give that person more authority within the cabinet to enforce the coalition's agreed-upon agenda.

List of deputy prime ministers

Kingdom of Italy

 Parties
1944–1946:

Coalitions

Italian Republic
 Parties
1946–1994:

1994–present:

Coalitions

Timeline

See also
 Prime Minister of Italy
 List of prime ministers of Italy
 Politics of Italy
 Lists of incumbents

References

 
Politics of Italy
1947 establishments in Italy